Thoggen is a DVD ripper for Linux within the GNOME project. It is based on GStreamer and GTK+. Thoggen can back up DVDs by re-encoding them using the Ogg Theora video codec.

Thoggen is designed to be easy and straightforward to use. It attempts to hide the complexity many other transcoding tools expose and tries to offer sensible defaults that work well for most people most of the time.

Features 
 Encodes into Ogg/Theora video
 Based on the GStreamer multimedia framework
 Supports title preview, picture cropping and resizing.
 Language Selection for audio track
 Can encode from local directory with video DVD files

Weaknesses 
 Thoggen is slow.

 Thoggen can only encode video into the Theora codec. But since the software is based on the GStreamer multimedia framework, it is fairly easy to add additional encoding formats/codecs in future versions.
 Thoggen includes a feature to "make video certain quality". However, the numerics to choose from (ranging from 0 to 63) for the encoding process are less-than-obvious to interpret for users.
 Subtitles are not yet supported

See also 

 Theora
 MEncoder
 List of GTK+ applications
 List of video editing software
 Comparison of DVD ripper software

References

 Andrew Min, Choose the DVD ripper that's right for you, March 6, 2008, linux.com

External links
 Official website
 SourceForge project page

Free video software
Free software programmed in C
DVD rippers
GNOME Applications
Optical disc-related software that uses GTK
Software that uses GStreamer